Sanjay Bhashkar Raimulkar  is a Shiv Sena politician from Buldhana district, Maharashtra. He is a member of the 14th Maharashtra Legislative Assembly. He represents the Mehkar Assembly Constituency as member of Shiv Sena. He has been elected to Vidhan Sabha for two consecutive terms in 2009 and 2014.

Positions held
 2008: Sabhapati, Krishi Utpanna Bazaar Samiti, Mehkar
 2009: Elected to Maharashtra Legislative Assembly (1st term)
 2014: Re-elected to Maharashtra Legislative Assembly (2nd term)
 2019: Re-elected to Maharashtra Legislative Assembly (3rd term)

See also
 Buldhana Lok Sabha constituency

References

External links
 Shiv Sena Official website

Maharashtra MLAs 2014–2019
Living people
Shiv Sena politicians
People from Buldhana district
Maharashtra MLAs 2009–2014
Marathi politicians
1964 births